NeuroImage is a peer-reviewed scientific journal covering research on neuroimaging, including functional neuroimaging and functional human brain mapping. The current Editor in Chief is Stephen Smith. Abstracts from the annual meeting of the Organization for Human Brain Mapping have been published as supplements to the journal. Members of the Organization for Human Brain Mapping are eligible for reduced subscription rates. In 2012, Elsevier launched an online-only, open access sister journal to NeuroImage, entitled NeuroImage: Clinical.

Related journals are Human Brain Mapping, Cerebral Cortex, Magnetic Resonance in Medicine, Journal of Neuroscience and Journal of Cognitive Neuroscience.

Abstracting and indexing 
The journal is abstracted and indexed in Scopus, Science Citation Index, Current Contents/Life Sciences, and BIOSIS Previews.  According to the Journal Citation Reports, the journal has a 2021 impact factor of 7.4.

References

External links 

 

Neuroimaging journals
Elsevier academic journals
Publications established in 1993
English-language journals